South Tippah Creek is a stream in the U.S. state of Mississippi. It joins with North Tippah Creek to form the Tippah River.

Tippah is a name derived from the Choctaw language purported to mean "to eat one another", i.e. cannibalism. Variant names are "Little Tippah Creek" and "Tippah Creek".

References

Rivers of Mississippi
Rivers of Tippah County, Mississippi
Mississippi placenames of Native American origin